John White (3 January 1826 – 13 January 1891) was an English public servant and ethnographer in New Zealand, known for his work on the history and traditions of the Māori people.

Life
Son of Francis White, he was born in England, and went out to New Zealand with his father in 1832, settling first at Kororāreka. His uncle, William White, was a Wesleyan missionary in nearby Hokianga and may have encouraged their emigration to New Zealand. Kororāreka was sacked by the  Māori forces at the beginning of the Flagstaff War in 1845, and the White family moved to Auckland.

White was employed by the government in positions where he came much into contact with the Māori people. Subsequently, he was gold commissioner at Coromandel, and was appointed official interpreter and agent for the purchase of lands; he succeeded in obtaining for the colonists the title to most of the land round Auckland.

Later White became magistrate of Central Whanganui. He died during a visit to Auckland on 13 January 1891.

Works
[[File:Heitiki01.jpg|thumb|right|Sketch of a hei-tiki, from John White, 'The Ancient History of the Maori]]
White was employed by the government of New Zealand to compile a complete history of the Māori traditions; he had completed six volumes at the time of his death. They appeared in 1889 with the title The Ancient History of the Maori (Wellington). He was also author of a novelette, entitled Te Rou, Or, The Māori at Home'' (1874).

NotesAttribution'''

1826 births
1891 deaths
New Zealand ethnographers
New Zealand public servants
English emigrants to New Zealand
Gold commissioners
People from Cockfield, County Durham